Dasyuris hectori is a species of moth in the family Geometridae. It is endemic to New Zealand.

References

Larentiinae
Moths of New Zealand
Moths described in 1877
Endemic fauna of New Zealand
Taxa named by Arthur Gardiner Butler
Endemic moths of New Zealand